The 2005 Melanesian Championships in Athletics took place between April 22–24, 2005. The event was held at the Sir Ignatius Kilage Stadium in Lae, Papua New Guinea, in conjunction with the Papua New Guinea National Athletics Championships.  Detailed reports were given for the OAA.

A total of 31 events were contested, 18 by men and 13 by women.

Medal summary
Medal winners and their results were published on the Athletics Weekly webpage.  Complete results can be found on the Athletics Papua New Guinea and for the first two days on the Oceania Athletics Association webpages.

Men

Women

Medal table (unofficial)

References

Melanesian Championships in Athletics
Athletics in Papua New Guinea
International sports competitions hosted by Papua New Guinea
Melanesian Championships
2005 in Papua New Guinean sport
April 2005 sports events in Oceania